The State Council of the Udmurt Republic is the regional parliament of Udmurtia, a federal subject of Russia. A total of 60 deputies are elected for five-year terms.

It succeeded the Supreme Council of the Udmurt Republic in 1994. Initially 100 deputies were elected to the State Council. This number was later reduced to 90, and then to 60.

The presiding officer is the Chairman of the State Council of Udmurtia.

Elections

2017

2022

See also
List of Chairmen of the State Council of the Udmurt Republic

References

Udmurtia
Politics of Udmurtia
Udmurtia